Sewa taiwana is a moth of the family Drepanidae first described by Alfred Ernest Wileman in 1911. It is found in Taiwan.

References

Moths described in 1911
Drepaninae
Moths of Taiwan